Sehari is a 2022 Indian Telugu-language romantic comedy film directed by debutant Gnanasagar Dwaraka. The film stars debutant Harsh Kanumilli and Simran Choudhary. The title is inspired from the song of the same name from the film Oy! (2009).

The music is composed by Prashanth R Vihari while cinematography and editing is done by Suresh Sarangam and Ravi Teja Girijala respectively. Produced by Virgo Pictures, the film was theatrically released on 11 February 2022. The film received negative critical reviews on release.

Plot  
Shattered by his break-up with his toxic girlfriend Subbalachmi, a disturbed young man Varun takes a hasty decision to get married, despite objection from his friends Vasu and Vinni. During the arrangements for his wedding with his fiancé Aliya, things take a different turn as Varun ends up falling for Aliya's elder sister Amulya, a fashion designer who is four years elder than him.

Cast 
 Harsh Kanumilli as Varun
 Simran Choudhary as Amulya
 Abhinav Gomatam as Vasu
 Snehaja Velidindi as Aliya
 Akshitha Shetty as Subbalachmi
 Praneeth Reddy Kallem as Vinni
 Anisha Alla as Pooja Akka
 Saluri Koteswara Rao as Vikram, Varun's father
 Rajeshwari Mullapudi as Varun's mother
 N Balakrishna as Amulya and Aliya's father
 Nandu as a passerby (Cameo)

Soundtrack 

The soundtrack and score of the film is composed by Prashanth R Vihari.

Release 
The film was theatrically released on 11 February 2022 coinciding with the release of Khiladi.

Reception 
The film received negative reviews from critics. 123 Telugu gave the film a rating of 2.75/5 and wrote "'Sehari' is a passable rom-com that has a good first half and climax. The situational comedy works out well but the film is filled with lag in multiple scenes". Thadhagath Pathi of The Times of India gave the film 2.5/5 and wrote "'Sehari' is not a terrible rom-com, it's just not innovative or fresh either. If you're not bored of the same stories the film industry keeps churning out, this one's for you".

Pinkvilla gave the film a rating of 2 out of 5 and wrote "Abhinav Gomatam, as Varun's friend, is deployed to do the needful. In a film whose writing is consistently silly, Prashanth R Vihari's music is the film's only meritorious aspect. 'Idhi Chala Bagundhile' is enjoyable. The cinematography is another asset". Prakash Pecheti of Telangana Today stated "Although 'Sehari' looks to be a tested trope in the very first glimpse, it has the screenplay that doesn't deviate your attention as an audience. Away from the regular cliched film conversation in a commercial cinema, director Gnanasagar tries to present the comedy in a more organic and subtle manner".

References

External Links 

2022 films
2020s Telugu-language films
Indian romantic comedy films
2022 romantic comedy films
Films set in Hyderabad, India
Films shot in Hyderabad, India